Chetnya Nanda (born 29 March 1979) is an Indian professional cricketer who both plays for Delhi. He has also played for Mumbai Indians. Nanda was born in Delhi. He is a right-hand batsman and a leg-break bowler.

References

External links
Chetanya Nanda at Cricinfo
CricketArchive page

Indian cricketers
Living people
1979 births
Delhi cricketers
Mumbai Indians cricketers
India Green cricketers
India Blue cricketers
North Zone cricketers